Kitchissippi Ward (Ward 15) is a city ward in the city of Ottawa, Ontario, Canada. It gets its name from the Algonquin name for the Ottawa River, meaning Great River. The ward is slightly west of downtown, and covers the neighbourhoods of Champlain Park, Civic Hospital, Hampton Park, Highland Park,  Hintonburg, Island Park, McKellar Heights, McKellar Park, Mechanicsville, Westboro Beach, Westboro, Wellington Village, and Wellington Street West.

As of the 2014 election on October 27, 2014, the ward is represented by Councillor Jeff Leiper.

The ward was created in 1994 from parts of Queensboro Ward, Richmond Ward and Elmdale Ward.

City councillors
Joan Wong (1994-1997)
Shawn Little (1997-2006)
Christine Leadman (2006-2010)
Katherine Hobbs (2010-2014)
Jeff Leiper (2014–present)

Population data
The Ward's estimated population will be 38,900 in 2006. At the Canada 2001 Census it had 36,795 people.

Languages (mother tongue)
English: 54.5%
French: 15.6%
Arabic: 7.9%
Spanish: 1.8%
Chinese: 1.1% (inc. Mandarin, Cantonese and Chinese)
Italian: 1.1%

Religion
Roman Catholic: 36.2%
No religion: 21.4%
United Church of Canada: 10.2%
Anglican: 9.9%
Muslim: 3.2%
Jewish: 2.6%
Presbyterian: 2.5%
Buddhist: 1.6%
Baptist: 1.6%
Lutheran: 1.0%

Income
Average household income: $70,307
Average income (male): $46,904
Average income (female): $33,443

Election results

2022 Ottawa municipal election

2018 Ottawa municipal election

2014 Ottawa municipal election

2010 Ottawa municipal election

2006 Ottawa municipal election

Dropped Out

 Daniel Stringer 
 Shawn Little

2003 Ottawa municipal election

2000 Ottawa municipal election

1997 elections

1994 elections

References

External links
 2001 Census
 Map of Kitchissippi Ward

Ottawa wards